Tuyaboʻgʻiz is an urban-type settlement in Tashkent Region, Uzbekistan. It is part of Oʻrtachirchiq District. The town population in 1989 was 4895 people.

See also
 Tuyabuguz Reservoir

References

Populated places in Tashkent Region
Urban-type settlements in Uzbekistan